"" ( : Now praise God on a high throne) is a Christian hymn in German, published in 1603. Caspar Ulenberg wrote it in 1582, based on Psalm 117, and modified a 1542 melody by Guillaume Franc. It is part of German hymnals, including the German Catholic hymnal Gotteslob, which has it as GL 393 in the section "Leben in Gott – Lob, Dank und Anbetung" (Life in God – Praise, thanks and adoration). It is also part of other hymnals and songbooks.

The text consists of three stanzas of four lines each, rhyming AABB.

References

External links 
 

Christian songs
1603 songs
17th-century hymns in German